The women's heptathlon event at the 2001 Summer Universiade was held at the Workers Stadium in Beijing, China between 28 and 29 August.

Results

References

IAAF 2001 Top list

Athletics at the 2001 Summer Universiade
2001 in women's athletics
2001